Violeta de Outono & Orquestra is a live video by Brazilian psychedelic rock band Violeta de Outono, released by Voiceprint Records in 2006. It was recorded during a show at the Teatro Popular do SESI on November 9, 2004 with the special participation of the USP Symphonic Orchestra, conducted by maestro Juliano Suzuki.

Tracks

"Outono"
"Mahavishnu"
"Mulher na Montanha"
"Blues"
"Lírio de Vidro"
"Supernova"
"Eyes Like Butterflies"
"Espectro"
"Júpiter"
"Faces"
"Sombras Flutuantes"
"Declínio de Maio"
"Tomorrow Never Knows"
"Dia Eterno"

Personnel
 Fabio Golfetti – vocals, guitar
 Cláudio Souza – drums
 Angelo Pastorello – bass, craviola, Moog

References

2006 video albums
Live video albums
2006 live albums
Voiceprint Records albums
Violeta de Outono albums
Portuguese-language live albums